National Route 239 is a national highway of Japan connecting Abashiri, Hokkaidō and Rumoi, Hokkaidō in Japan, with a total length of 346.6 km (215.37 mi).

References

National highways in Japan
Roads in Hokkaido